Willyce Kim (born 1946) is an American writer. She is generally recognized to be the first openly-lesbian, Asian American poet to be published in the United States. Kim published her first book of poetry in 1971 and continued to publish poetry and novels throughout the 1970s and 1980s. She also contributed to a number of lesbian literary reviews throughout this time period. Her work is characterized by its celebration of lesbianism, strong women, and queer kinship.

Background and education

Kim, who has lived in Oakland, California, since the early 1970s, was born in 1946 in Honolulu, Hawaii, to Korean American parents. Raised Catholic, Kim attended Catholic schools, graduating with a degree in English literature in 1968 from San Francisco College of Women (later becoming Lone Mountain College, which, in turn, was eventually acquired by the University of San Francisco). While at San Francisco College of Women, Kim served as editor of Tradewinds, the campus literary magazine.

Career

Kim was an early member of the Women's Press Collective, an Oakland-based collective that facilitated the printing and distribution of self-published books by lesbians. Kim's later works were published by Alyson Publications, a Boston-based publisher specializing in LGBT literature. Kim's work also appeared in literary journals such as Women's Press, Everywoman, Furies, Plexus, Sinister Wisdom, Conditions Ten, IKON, and Phoenix Rising.

Throughout the 1970s and into the 1980s, Kim participated in readings and open mics along with other Bay Area poets including Pat Parker and Kitty Tsui. Among the venues where Kim read were A Woman's Place bookstore in Oakland, Scott's, a lesbian biker bar in San Francisco's Castro district, Modern Times Bookstore in San Francisco, 
 Ollie's in Oakland, and A Different Light, an LGBT bookstore in San Francisco.

Kim's work has influenced writers such as Alexander Chee and Merle Woo and has been reviewed both in the LGBTQ press and the mainstream press.

In 1985, Kim began working in the library at UC Berkeley where she served in a variety of supervisory positions in Doe Library for 25 years.

Works

Poetry

 1971: Curtains of Light. With illustrations by Carmel  Kim. Self-published.
 1972: Eating Artichokes. Poems by Willyce Kim with photographs by Willyce Kim and Wendy Cadden. Published by Woman's Press Collective.
 1976: Under the Rolling Sky. Published by Maud Gonne Press.

Fiction

 1985: Dancer Dawkins and the California Kid. Alyson Publications.
 1988: Dead Heat. Alyson Publications.

Anthologies and collections 
(partial list)

 1972: "Look I’m Huddled On Your Doorstep." Amazon Quarterly 1(3): 45.
 1981: "A Woman’s Tribal Belt" and "Keeping Still, Mountain." In Lesbian Poetry, an Anthology: 157–158. 
 1984: "In This Heat ...," "Home Coming," and "Touching Bottom and Pushing Out." IKON 2(3): 74–5.
 1986: "In This Heat ..." Contact II Winter/Spring 1986.
 1990: excerpt from Dead Heat. In Women on Women: An Anthology of American Lesbian Short Fiction: 263–70
 1995: "In This Heat..." and "Home Coming."  In Premonitions: the Kaya Anthology of New Asian North American Poetry: 168–17.
 2000:  "Myrmidon Grief" and "Flagstones." Harrington Lesbian Fiction Quarterly 1 (1): 141–42. 
 2001: excerpt from Dancer Dawkins and the California Kid. In Kori: the Beacon Anthology of Korean American Fiction: 220–25
 2002: "Passages." (short story)  Harrington Lesbian Fiction Quarterly 2 (4): 41–51.

Bibliography 
(partial list)

Cade, Cathy, A Lesbian Photo Album: The Lives of Seven Lesbian Feminists, Oakland, CA: Waterwoman Books, 1987.

Juan, Karin Aguilar-San. "Landmarks in literature by Asian American lesbians." Signs: Journal of Women in Culture and Society 18, no. 4 (1993): 936–943.

Kim, Elaine H. "'These Bearers of a Homeland': An Overview of Korean American Literature, 1934–2001." Korea Journal 41, no. 3 (2001): 149–200.

Kyung, Min Eun, "To American and Beyond: Diaspora in Korean American Writing," Korean Literature Now, 25 (Autumn 2014).

Van Ausdall, Mimi Iimuro. "'The Day All of the Different Parts of Me Can Come Along': Intersectionality and US Third World Feminism in the Poetry of Pat Parker and Willyce Kim." Journal of Lesbian Studies 19, no. 3 (2015): 336–356.

우효경. "Korean American Queer Poetics in Willyce Kim’s Eating Artichokes." 현대영미시연구 24, no. 1 (2018): 183–211.

References 

American LGBT poets
American women poets
American writers of Korean descent
American LGBT novelists
1946 births
Writers from Oakland, California
American lesbian writers
20th-century American women writers
American LGBT people of Asian descent
Writers from Honolulu
Living people
21st-century American women writers
20th-century American poets
American women novelists
20th-century American novelists
Poets from California
Poets from Hawaii
University of California, Berkeley staff
Novelists from Hawaii
University of San Francisco alumni
Novelists from California